Averrhoa bilimbi (commonly known as bilimbi, cucumber tree, or tree sorrel) is a fruit-bearing tree of the genus Averrhoa, family Oxalidaceae. It is believed to be originally native to the Maluku Islands of Indonesia but has naturalized and is common throughout Southeast Asia. It is cultivated in parts of tropical South Asia and the Americas. It bears edible extremely sour fruits. It is a close relative of the carambola tree.

Description
Averrhoa bilimbi is a small tropical tree reaching up to 15m in height. It is often multitrunked, quickly dividing into ramifications. Bilimbi leaves are alternate, pinnate, measuring approximately 30–60 cm in length. Each leaf contains 11-37 leaflets; ovate to oblong, 2–10 cm long and 1–2 cm wide and cluster at branch extremities. The leaves are quite similar to those of the Otaheite gooseberry. The tree is cauliflorous with 18–68 flowers in panicles that form on the trunk and other branches. The flowers are heterotristylous, borne in a pendulous panicle inflorescence. There flower is fragrant, corolla of 5 petals 10–30 mm long, yellowish green to reddish purple. 

The fruit is ellipsoidal, elongated, measuring about 4 – 10 cm and sometimes faintly 5-angled. The skin, smooth to slightly bumpy, thin and waxy turning from light green to yellowish-green when ripe. The flesh is crisp and the juice is sour and extremely acidic and therefore not typically consumed as fresh fruit by itself.

Distribution and habitat
A. bilimbi is believed to be originally native to Moluccas, Indonesia, the species is now cultivated and found throughout Indonesia, Timor-Leste, the Philippines, Sri Lanka, Bangladesh, Maldives, Myanmar (Burma) and Malaysia. It is also common in other Southeast Asian countries. In India, where it is usually found in gardens, the bilimbi has gone wild in the warmest regions of the country. It is also seen in coastal regions of South India.

Outside of Asia, the tree is cultivated in Zanzibar. In 1793, the bilimbi was introduced to Jamaica from Timor and after several years, was cultivated throughout Central and South America where it is known as mimbro. In Suriname this fruit is known as lange birambi. Introduced to Queensland at the end of the 19th century, it has been grown commercially in the region since that time.
In Guyana, it is called Sourie, One finger, Bilimbi and Kamranga.

This is essentially a tropical tree, less resistant to cold than the carambola, growing best in rich and well-drained soil (but also stands limestone and sand). It prefers evenly distributed rainfall throughout the year, but with a 2- to 3-month dry season. Therefore, the species is not found, for example, in the wettest part of Malaysia. In Florida, where it is an occasional curiosity, the tree needs protection from wind and cold.

Culinary interest

In Indonesia, A. bilimbi, locally known as belimbing wuluh, is often used to give sour or an acidic flavor to food, substituting tamarind or tomato. In the north western province of Aceh, it is preserved by salting and sun-drying to make asam sunti, a kitchen seasoning to make a variety of Acehnese dishes. It a key ingredient in many Indonesian dishes such as sambal belimbing wuluh.

In the Philippines, where it is commonly called kamias and ibâ, are commonly found in backyards. The fruits are eaten either raw or dipped in rock salt. It can be either curried or added as a souring agent for common Filipino dishes such as sinigang, pinangat and paksiw. It is being sun-dried for preservation. It is also used to make salad mixed with tomatoes, chopped onions with soy sauce as dressing.

The uncooked bilimbi is prepared as relish and served with rice and beans in Costa Rica.

In the Far East, where the tree originated, it is sometimes added to curry.

In Malaysia, it also is made into a rather sweet jam.

In Kerala and Bhatkal, India, it is used for making pickles and to make fish curry, especially with sardines, while around Karnataka, Maharashtra and Goa the fruit is commonly eaten raw with salt and spice. In Guyana and Mauritius, it is made into achars/pickles.

In Maldives where it is known as bilimagu, it is pickled with aromatic spices and eaten with rice and local Garudhiya (fish soup). It is also used in various Maldivian local dishes such as Boakibaa and Mashuni as a souring agent.  

In Seychelles, it is often used as an ingredient to give a tangy flavor to many Seychellois creole dishes, especially fish dishes. It is often used in grilled fish and also (almost always) in a shark meat dish, called satini reken. It is also cooked down with onion, tomato, and chili peppers to make a sauce. Sometimes they are cured with salt to be used when they are out of season.

Bilimbi juice (with a pH of about 4.47) is made into a cooling beverage. It can replace mango in making chutney. Additionally, the fruit can be preserved by pickling, which reduces its acidity.

Potential adverse effect

The fruit contains high levels of oxalate. Acute kidney failure due to tubular necrosis caused by oxalate has been recorded in several people who drank the concentrated juice on continuous days as treatment for high cholesterol.

Other uses 
In Malaysia, very acidic bilimbis are used to clean kris blades. 

In the Philippines, it is often used in rural places as an alternative stain remover.

In the region of Addu in Maldives, the flowers of the bilimbi plant were commonly used in the 20th century as a cloth dye.

Gallery

See also
 Averrhoa carambola, a closely related tree

References

External links 

Edible fruits
Flora of the Maldives
Fruit trees
Oxalidaceae
Plants described in 1753
Taxa named by Carl Linnaeus
Trees of Bangladesh
Trees of Indo-China
Trees of Malesia
Trees of Sri Lanka